There are three radio telescopes designated RT-70, all in countries that were once part of the former Soviet Union, all with similar specifications: 70m dishes and an operating range of 5–300 GHz. The Yevpatoria telescope has also been used as a radar telescope in observations of space debris and asteroids.

With their 70m antenna diameter, they are among the largest radio telescopes in the world.

They are:
 the Yevpatoria RT-70 radio telescope at the former soviet Center for Deep Space Communications or West Center for Deep Space Communications, Yevpatoria, Crimea (Russian-annexed, internationally recognised as part of Ukraine)
 the Galenki RT-70 radio telescope at the East Center for Deep Space Communications, Galenki (Ussuriysk), Russia
 the Suffa RT-70 radio telescope at the Suffa Radio Observatory on the Suffa plateau, Uzbekistan

In 2008, RT-70 was used to beam 501 messages at the exoplanet Gliese 581c, in hopes of making contact with extraterrestrial intelligence. The messages should arrive in 2029.

See also 
 RT-64, a smaller aperture Russian design.

References

External links 
 Yevpatoria RT-70 radio telescope (in Russian)
 Suffa RT-70 radio telescope (in Russian)
 Suffa Radio Observatory in Uzbekistan: progress and radio-seeing research plans
 Russian Space Agency Backs US Asteroid Control Plan (mentions Galenki telescope)
 Don P. Mitchel. Soviet Telemetry Systems. Deep-Space Communication Centers

Radio telescopes
Soviet inventions